Brachygalaxias gothei (known locally as puye) is a species of fish in the family Galaxiidae endemic to Chile. It was formerly listed as Vulernable in 1994 until being changed in 1996. It is considered a synonym of Brachygalaxias bullocki but is listed separately by the IUCN Red List.

References

Brachygalaxias
Freshwater fish of Chile
Fish described in 1982
Taxonomy articles created by Polbot
Endemic fauna of Chile